KNUN may refer to:

 KNUN (FM), a radio station (91.9 FM) licensed to serve Toksook Bay, Alaska, United States
 Saufley Field (ICAO code KNUN)